is the fifth studio album by Swedish singer Håkan Hellström, released on 26 March 2008. It was produced by Håkan Hellström with Joakim Åhlund. Three singles were released from the album; "", "" and "".

Track listing

"" Faith And Doubt
"" For A Long Long Time
"" Gypsy Life Dreamin'
"" Love Is A Letter Sent A Thousand Times
"" I Don't Know Who I Am But I Know I'm Yours
"" Too Late For Edelweiss
"" In Love With An Angel
"" Song Inside A Bus Gone Astray 2007
"" The Four Seasons
"" Long Roads
"" Fly Little Butterfly
"" Not Owing Anyone Anything

Charts

Weekly Charts

Year-end charts

References

2008 albums
Håkan Hellström albums
Swedish-language albums